Postmasburg is a town in the Northern Cape province of South Africa.

Location
The Town is located approximately 170 km east of Upington.

History
Originally a station of the London Missionary Society called Sibiling, it became a Griqua village with the name Blinkklip. It was proclaimed a town on 6 June 1892 and named after the Reverend Dirk Postma (1818-1890), founder of the Reformed Church.

The town achieved municipal status in 1936.

Army
The South African Army's Combat Training Centre is located nearby, at Lohatla.

Sport
The town is home to Hungry Lions, a soccer team playing in the National First Division.

Economy

Postmasburg is home to Kolomela Mine which is owned by Anglo American. 
The Iron Ore mine officially opened in June 2012 provides job opportunities for the local communities and a green hydrogen plant is estimated to be built by 2029 by Thabiso Dube to form more job opportunities.

See also
 Redstone Solar Thermal Power
 Jasper Solar Energy Project
 Lesedi Solar Park

References

Populated places in the Tsantsabane Local Municipality